The 2004 North Queensland Cowboys season was the 11th in the club's history. Coached by Graham Murray and captained by Travis Norton, they competed in the NRL's 2005 Telstra Premiership. They finished the regular season in 5th and played in their first Grand Final, which they lost to the Wests Tigers.

Season summary

Milestones 
 Round 1: Justin Smith, Johnathan Thurston and Carl Webb made their debuts for the club.
 Round 4: Paul Rauhihi played his 50th game for the club.
 Round 8: Paul Bowman scored his 50th try for the club.
 Round 9: Jaiman Lowe played his 50th game for the club.
 Round 9: Paul Bowman played his 150th game for the club.
 Round 9: Matt Sing scored his 50th try for the club.
 Round 16: Matthew Bowen scored his 50th try for the club.
 Round 18: Aaron Payne played his 50th game for the club.
 Round 20: Brett Firman made his debut for the club.
 Round 21: Ty Williams scored his 50th try for the club.
 Round 23: Matthew Bowen played his 100th game for the club.
 Finals Week 2: Luke O'Donnell played his 50th game for the club.

Squad List

Squad Movement

2005 Gains

2005 Losses

Ladder

Fixtures

Regular season

Finals

Statistics 

Source:

Representatives 
The following players played a representative match in 2005.

Honours

League 
 Dally M Medal: Johnathan Thurston
 Dally M Halfback of the Year: Johnathan Thurston
 Rugby League Players Association Player of the Year: Johnathan Thurston

Club 
 Player of the Year: Johnathan Thurston
 Players' Player: Paul Bowman
 Club Person of the Year: Rod Jensen

Feeder Clubs

Queensland Cup 
  North Queensland Young Guns – 1st, Premiers

References 

North Queensland Cowboys seasons
North Queensland Cowboys season